Battle of N'Djamena may refer to:

Battle of N'Djamena (1979)
Battle of N'Djamena (1980)
Battle of N'Djamena (2006)
Battle of N'Djamena (2008)